Austrogaster is a genus of fungi in the family Paxillaceae. The genus contains three species found in temperate South America, and New Zealand. The genus was circumscribed by Rolf Singer in 1962.

References

Paxillaceae
Boletales genera
Taxa named by Rolf Singer